Santa Maria de Cóll is a Romanesque church in Cóll in the municipality of  Vall de Boí, Catalonia, Spain. It was consecrated in the year 1110. It became a Bien de Interés Cultural site in 1992, and in 2000 it was declared part of the Vall de Boí UNESCO World Heritage Site.

Description
It is thought to have been built in the 12th century. 
Its nave, which is not flanked with aisles, is covered with barrel vaulting reinforced by two arches supported by columns without capitals. At the eastern end, there is a semi-circular apse. A quadrangular bell tower with a steeple stands against the south façade.

On the north side, there is a chapel with a barrel vault which, together with the chapel on the south side gives the impression of a transept. The Gothic choir at the back of the church can be reached by a staircase next to the main entrance. The exterior is decorated with a series of blind arches which surround the entire building just below the roof. An oculus in the western gable provides illumination. The main door at the east end is crowned with an arch supported by columns with decorated capitals. Those on the outside are decorated with plant designs while those inside have figures of men fighting with animals symbolizing the fight between good and evil.

Inside the church there is a statue of Our Lady of the Rosary.

Gallery

References

External links

Churches in Catalonia
Romanesque architecture in Catalonia
Bien de Interés Cultural landmarks in the Province of Lleida
1110 establishments in Europe
Vall de Boí